Richard Dale (1756–1826) was an American naval officer.

Dick, Dickie or Richard Dale may also refer to:
 Richard Dale (economist) (born 1943), economist, lawyer and historian
 Dick Dale (1937–2019), American surf guitarist
 Dick Dale (singer) (1926–2014), American singer and saxophonist on The Lawrence Welk Show
 Dick Dale Creek, a stream in Southeast Fairbanks Census Area, Alaska, United States
 Dickie Dale (1927–1961), English Grand Prix motorcycle racer
 Dickie Dale (footballer) (1896–1970), English footballer

See also 
 Richard Daley (disambiguation)